Shanti Stupa may refer to:

Shanti Stupa, Delhi
Shanti Stupa, Ladakh
Shanti Stupa, Pokhara